Androstanolone valerate (brand name Apeton), also known as stanolone valerate or dihydrotestosterone pentanoate, as well as 5α-androstan-17β-3-one 17β-valerate, is a synthetic androgen and anabolic steroid and a dihydrotestosterone ester. It is used as an injectable and acts as a prodrug of androstanolone (stanolone, dihydrotestosterone, DHT).

See also
 List of androgen esters § Dihydrotestosterone esters

References

Androgens and anabolic steroids
Androstanes
Dihydrotestosterone esters
Prodrugs
Valerate esters